Seskarö (Finnish: Seittenkaari) is a locality situated in Haparanda Municipality, Norrbotten County, Sweden with 491 inhabitants in 2010. It is located on the island with the same name which is about 20 km2 and situated in the Haparanda Archipelago. Since 1978, it has been connected to the mainland through a bridge, via some intermediate islands.

References

External links
seskaro.net
Seskarö i Bottniska viken

Populated places in Haparanda Municipality
Norrbotten
Islands of Norrbotten County